Erin Heather Bubley (born March 4, 1989), known professionally as Erin Heatherton, is an American model. She was a Victoria's Secret Angel from 2010 to 2013.

Early life
Heatherton was born and raised in Skokie, Illinois, the daughter of Laura (née Stein) and Mark Bubley. Her family is Jewish, and she attended Solomon Schechter Day School, a Jewish day school, as well as Niles North High School. She grew up competing in science fairs and played basketball for Niles North High School.

Career
Heatherton was discovered by modeling scout Arri Taylor while vacationing with a friend on South Beach, Miami. At the age of 17, Heatherton moved to New York City and signed with the Marilyn Agency. She made her runway debut in September 2006 at the Diane von Fürstenberg fashion show. She has since walked the runway for Prada, Stella McCartney, Chanel, Tommy Hilfiger, Marc Jacobs, Jason Wu, Carolina Herrera, Michael Kors, Christian Lacroix, Lacoste, Valentino, Oscar de la Renta, Zac Posen, Dolce & Gabbana, Moschino, L.A.M.B., Elie Saab, Carmen Marc Valvo, Derek Lam, Etro and Isaac Mizrahi.

At the age of 17, she booked her first cover with Italy's Flair. She has since appeared on the magazine covers of D, Grazia, Velvet, Elle (Serbia, Russia, France and Czech Republic) GQ (Spain, UK, Mexico and Germany), Beauty in Vogue, Ocean Drive, Russh, L'Officiel Hommes 2, Flair, and Muse. Additionally, she has appeared in editorials for Mixte, Cosmopolitan, Glamour, Interview, Numero, V, Marie Claire, and Harper's Bazaar. Heatherton's campaigns include Chopard, XOXO, Diesel, Versace, Lord & Taylor, Blanco, Buffalo Jeans, BLK DNM, John Galliano, H&M, Blugirl, Lacoste, Armani, Liu Jo, Valentino, Karl Lagerfeld, Osiris, Pronovias, and Dolce & Gabbana.

Heatherton began walking in the Victoria's Secret Fashion Show in 2008. Heatherton was officially contracted as a Victoria's Secret Angel from 2010 to 2013. She appeared in several television commercials and advertising campaigns for the brand, including a billboard in New York City for the company's "Showstopper" launch. In 2013, it was announced that Heatherton had signed with IMG. Heatherton was ranked at number 35 on Askmen's list of the "Top 99 Most Desirable" women for 2013. She played at the annual exhibition basketball game 2014 NBA All-Star Celebrity Game on February 14, 2014. In January 2015, Heatherton became a brand ambassador for men’s fragrance, Curve Sport and appeared in Victoria's Secret's "Very Sexy Now" fragrance's spring 2015 advertising campaign. She modeled in Sports Illustrated Swimsuit Issues in 2015 and 2016. In 2016, she was featured in various campaigns for Adore Cosmetics and became a brand ambassador for NFL Women’s Apparel Collection. In 2017, she modeled for Kikirio Swimwear.

Fashion stylist Clare Byrne sued Heatherton in 2017 for $10 million as compensation for a proposed sportswear line called RetroActive that never got off the ground.

In 2019, she signed with Select Model Management. After a prolonged hiatus, she returned to modeling and appeared on the cover of Chicago Splash magazine in November 2019.

In 2019, Heatherton Co-Founded Resistance Chicago Lagree, a group fitness studio in Chicago's Wicker Park neighborhood.

Personal life 
She currently resides in Chicago, Illinois. She is the godmother to model Lily Aldridge’s daughter.

She has supported numerous charities, including Global Poverty Project, and the Global Citizen Festival, a concert to combat poverty held in Central Park that attracted 60,000 attendees.

Morton Square Condominium filed a civil lawsuit against Heatherton stating that the model "regularly causes and allows unreasonable levels of noise and bass vibrations... disturbing the condo's residents and interfering with their ability to use and enjoy their units."

In April 2019, Heatherton filed for bankruptcy, claiming to be "more than $500,000 in debt and made less than $3,000 this year." $100,000 of the debt was to Clare Byrne, her former business partner.

Heatherton dated actor Leonardo DiCaprio from December 2011 to November 2012.

On March 2, 2022, Heatherton announced her engagement to American-Polish trader Karol Kocemba.

Filmography

References

External links

 
 
 
 

1989 births
Living people
Female models from Illinois
Jewish female models
People from Skokie, Illinois
Victoria's Secret Angels
21st-century American women